Amta is a census town in Amta I CD Block in Uluberia subdivision of Howrah district in the Indian state of West Bengal.

Geography   

Demographics
As per 2011 Census of India Amta had a total population of 16,699 of which 8,454 (51%) were males and 8,245 (49%) were females. Population below 6 years was 1,522. The total number of literates in Amta was 12,918 (85.12% of the population over 6 years).

Transport
Since 2000 Amta is served by a broad gauge line but earlier it was served by the 45-km Howrah-Amta narrow-gauge route of the Martin's Light Railways, a private rail service established in 1892. The rail company was shut down in 1971. Amta railway station is part of the Kolkata Suburban Railway railway system.

Places to visit

The structure that adorns the streets of Amta is the popular Hindu Temple, Melai Chandi Mandir. Dedicated to Goddess Kali. The enclosed mandir complex is about 25 m x 35 m (approx) with four doors of each side that hosts. Gateway with office and service area, Nat mandir, an aatchala Durgeswar Shiva mandir and   recently build the Ramakrishna mandir. Although it is said that this shrine is one of the fifty-one Shakti Peetha but research finds any support but it is mentioned in the Chandi-mangal of Mukundarama Chakravarti, a masterpiece of 16th-century Bengali literature. There is no such date plaque fund at the old shrine.

Udang Kalimata Ashram: popularly known as Ashram. This is a holy place situated 6 km away from Amta town. There are four well decorated temples( Kali, Shiva, Krishna, Soni) in this ashram. Nowadays, Udang Kalimata Ashram is known as one of the popular tourist spots and picnic places of Howrah district.

References

Cities and towns in Howrah district